François Scheffer (1 July 1766 – 9 September 1844) was a Luxembourgian politician.  He served four stints as the Mayor of Luxembourg City, with a total tenure of twenty-one years.

There is a street in Limpertsberg, Luxembourg City, named after Scheffer (Allée Scheffer).

|-

|-

|-

Mayors of Luxembourg City
Independent politicians in Luxembourg
Luxembourgian jurists
1766 births
1844 deaths
People from Luxembourg City
19th-century Luxembourgian people